Martin Lapoš (born 16 January 1980) is a Slovak windsurfer. He competed in the men's Mistral One Design event at the 2004 Summer Olympics.

References

External links
 

1980 births
Living people
Slovak male sailors (sport)
Slovak windsurfers
Olympic sailors of Slovakia
Sailors at the 2004 Summer Olympics – Mistral One Design
Sportspeople from Žilina